Trox robinsoni is a beetle of the family Trogidae.

References 

robinsoni
Beetles described in 1955